Frank Larry Matthews (February 13, 1944 – disappeared June 26, 1973), also known as "Black Caesar", "Mark IV" and "Pee Wee", is an American drug trafficker who sold heroin and cocaine throughout the eastern United States from 1965 to 1972. He operated in 21 states and supplied drug dealers throughout every region of the country. The Drug Enforcement Administration (DEA) ranks Matthews as one of the top 10 drug traffickers in U.S. history and he is estimated to have had $20 million in savings.

Matthews led a flamboyant lifestyle, with luxury homes, vehicles and clothing along with prime seats at sporting events and regular trips to Las Vegas to launder money and gamble. He hosted an African-American and Hispanic drug dealers summit in Atlanta in 1971 and another in Las Vegas in 1972 to discuss how to break the American Mafia control of heroin importation. Matthews was arrested in 1973 on tax evasion and drug charges but disappeared and has been a fugitive from justice ever since.

Early life
Matthews was born on February 13, 1944, in Durham, North Carolina. His mother died when he was four years old and he was raised by his aunt, Marzella Steele, the wife of a Durham police lieutenant. Matthews was nicknamed "Pee Wee" and attended the East End Elementary school but dropped out of school in the seventh grade. At age 14, he led a teenage gang in stealing chickens from local farms. When confronted by a farmer, Matthews assaulted him with a brick. Matthews was arrested in October 1960 and served a year for theft and assault at the Raleigh State Reformatory for Boys in Raleigh, North Carolina. Upon his release, Matthews moved to Philadelphia, Pennsylvania, where he worked as a numbers writer. In Philadelphia, he made contacts that would become his future Philadelphia drug connections including Major Coxson and members of the Black Mafia.  Matthews was arrested in 1963 and avoided conviction by agreeing to leave Philadelphia. He moved to the Bedford–Stuyvesant area of New York City and became a barber, collecting numbers as he had in Philadelphia, as well as working as a collector and an enforcer.

Career
In 1965, Matthews grew tired of the numbers game and began to transition into the heroin drug trade in order to make more money. In the early 1960s, the main supply of wholesale heroin was the American Mafia through their famed French Connection. Matthews attempted to partner with the Gambino and Bonanno crime families, both part of the Five Families that controlled organized crime in New York City since the 1930s, however, both organizations declined. From his days in the numbers game he knew of "Spanish Raymond" Márquez, a prolific Harlem numbers operator. Márquez put him in contact with "El Padrino", the New York Cuban Mafia godfather Rolando Gonzalez Nuñez, a major Cuban cocaine supplier, shortly before Gonzalez fled to Venezuela because of an upcoming indictment in the United States. Before fleeing, Gonzalez sold Matthews his first kilogram of cocaine for $20,000, with a promise to supply more in the future.

This relationship expanded into a lucrative and expansive drug trafficking network. Gonzalez began sending Matthews large loads of cocaine and heroin from South America. Gonzalez continued to be a major figure in the international cocaine trade with bases in Miami, New Jersey and New York and partnerships with the Corsican Mafia. Gonzalez was arrested in Caracas, Venezuela in 1972 in a raid that netted 70 pounds of heroin and cocaine. Found not guilty, he again was arrested in the early 1980s, caught with 18 pounds of cocaine; he served 5 years in prison, retired from a life of crime, and quietly lived with his wife Esmeralda on a small farm near Caracas until his death in 1992.  Matthews expanded on this and, within a year, was one of the major players in the New York drug business. Realizing the need for diversification, he would continually seek out new sources of supply for narcotics, willing to do business with anyone as long as the product was sufficiently pure. Matthews also developed a cocaine dependence that grew along with his business and power.

By the early 1970s, the Matthews organization was handling multimillion-dollar loads of heroin. The Internal Revenue Service (IRS) estimates that he earned over $10 million in 1972.  According to the Drug Enforcement Administration (DEA), "Matthews controlled the cutting, packaging, and sale of heroin in every major East Coast city." In New York City, he operated two massive drug mills in Brooklyn: one located at 925 Prospect Place, nicknamed the "Ponderosa", and the other at 101 East 56th Street, nicknamed the "OK Corral". Both locations were heavily fortified and secured, with walls reinforced with steel and concrete and protected by guards with machine guns. Besides controlling the retail sale of heroin, the organization supplied other major dealers throughout the East Coast with multi-kilogram shipments for up to $26,000 per kilogram. He was known to supply heroin to Philadelphia through Major Coxson who then sold it to the Black Mafia.

Matthews purchased a house in the Mafia enclave in Todt Hill, Staten Island right across the street from the Gambino crime boss, Paul Castellano. Matthews would take multiple trips to Las Vegas with suitcases full of cash to have the drug money laundered at casinos for a fee of 15–18%.

In 1971, Matthews invited major African-American and Hispanic drug traffickers throughout the country to attend a meeting in Atlanta, Georgia. The DEA became aware of the meeting and monitored who attended. The topic of the meeting was how to import heroin without the Mafia. Those present decided to build stronger independent relationships with the Corsicans and possibly Cubans. In addition, they agreed to diversify their product to include cocaine, which was becoming available in massive quantities. This gathering of major drug traffickers throughout the United States is significant because it represented the changing nature of the drug business. Whereas, previously, the Italians controlled the importing and wholesaling of narcotics, therefore controlling who could and could not advance past them, now others were establishing their own pipelines. Before, the Mafia asserted behind-the-scenes control of the business while African-Americans sold and used the drugs in their cities; now the black dealers established connections and took control of their neighborhoods. This later evolved to include not just black people controlling the business, but also local gangs of black people eliminating out-of-town black suppliers trying to control their neighborhoods from a distance.

Matthews clashed with the Philadelphia Black Mafia and, on Easter Sunday in 1972 in Atlantic City, New Jersey, the Black Mafia killed Tyrone "Mr. Millionaire" Palmer, Matthews' main dealer in Philadelphia, at the "Club Harlem" packed with 600 people. Many innocent bystanders were shot during the shoot-out, with five people killed and twenty-six injured. No one was prosecuted for the crime and none of the 799 potential witnesses came forward. Three of Matthews' top lieutenants in the city were murdered by the Black Mafia.

In 1972, Matthews held another drug dealer summit in Las Vegas at the Sands Hotel during the Muhammad Ali vs. Jerry Quarry boxing match. Soon after this meeting, police received authority to tap his phone lines and he was recorded discussing drug transactions.

Ernie "Coco" Coralluzzo, an associate of the Genovese crime family's Greenwich Village Crew, negotiated the sale of 40 kilograms of heroin to Matthews for $375,000 during a meeting at the Waldorf Astoria New York in April 1973. While Matthews delivered the fee via an intermediary the following day, Coralluzzo failed to provide the drugs and instead fled to the Bahamas. Matthews and his associates then kidnapped James "Big Jimmy" Capotorto, an underling and bodyguard to Coralluzzo, in an effort to retrieve the money. Upon hearing of Capotorto's kidnapping, Coralluzzo took a flight to New York, returned the $375,000 to Matthews and gave him 25 kilograms of heroin on consignment.

Arrest and disappearance

In December 1972, Matthews was indicted by federal prosecutors in Brooklyn, charged with the attempted sale of 40 pounds of cocaine in Miami between April and September 1972. In January 1973, the DEA arrested Matthews at McCarran International Airport in Las Vegas, ahead of a planned trip to Los Angeles with his girlfriend Cheryl Denise Brown, on charges of tax evasion and conspiracy to distribute heroin and cocaine. A federal magistrate originally set bail at $5 million, the highest bail amount ever set at the time. The bail was reduced to $2.5 million when Matthews agreed to not fight extradition and be returned to New York. After a few weeks in detention in New York, his bail was further reduced to $325,000. He was indicted on six counts of tax evasion and conspiracy to distribute heroin and cocaine and faced 50 years in prison. On July 2, 1973, Matthews was scheduled to appear in a Brooklyn courthouse but never showed. He allegedly took $20 million and fled the country with Brown. Matthews left behind his common-law wife, their three sons and their Staten Island mansion and was never seen again. Former DEA agent Frank Panessa stated in a July 2022 podcast interview that the DEA received unconfirmed reports from informants that the Genovese family had lured Matthews to the Bahamas under the false pretence of aiding him while he was at large and subsequently killed him, partially due to fears that he may turn government witness and implicate the Mafia, and partially due to his feud with Ernie Coralluzzo.

The Federal Bureau of Investigation (FBI) placed a $20,000 bounty on Matthews, the highest set by a federal agency since the FBI placed the same amount for the capture of bank robber John Dillinger.

See also
 List of fugitives from justice who disappeared

Footnotes

References

External links
 IMDb: The Frank Matthews Story documentary on the life and times of Frank matthews (2012)

1944 births
1970s missing person cases
20th-century African-American people
20th-century American criminals
American male criminals
African-American gangsters
American crime bosses
American drug traffickers
American money launderers
Criminals from Brooklyn
Criminals from Staten Island
Criminals from North Carolina
Fugitives wanted by the United States
Fugitives wanted on drug trafficking charges
Gangsters from New York City
Gangsters from Philadelphia
Missing gangsters
People from Bedford–Stuyvesant, Brooklyn
People from Durham, North Carolina
People from Todt Hill, Staten Island
Possibly living people